
Michelle Marie Campbell (born May 12, 1984, in Iowa), aka Melisa Can, is retired female basketball player who played power forward.

Can grew up in Princeton, New Jersey and graduated from Notre Dame High School. She joined Rutgers in the 2002–03 season. She acquired Turkish citizenship in 2010 and consequently adopted the Turkish name of Melisa Can.

Rutgers statistics
Source

See also
 Turkish women in sports

References

External links
Profile at Eurobasket.com

1984 births
Living people
American women's basketball players
Turkish women's basketball players
American emigrants to Turkey
Turkish people of African-American descent
Naturalized citizens of Turkey
Power forwards (basketball)
Galatasaray S.K. (women's basketball) players
Basketball players from New Jersey
Notre Dame High School (New Jersey) alumni
People from Princeton, New Jersey
Sportspeople from Mercer County, New Jersey